Question 3 may refer to:
 2016 Maine Question 3 or An Act to Require Background Checks for Gun Sales
 Massachusetts Question 3, 2012 or Massachusetts Medical Marijuana Initiative
 2016 Massachusetts Question 3 or An Act to Prevent Cruelty to Farm Animals
 Question 3 (2018, Massachusetts) or Massachusetts Gender Identity Anti-Discrimination Initiative